Churul may refer to:

 Churul (cheese), a type of cheese in Tibetan cuisine
 Offering of Churul, a ritual of the Ayyavazhi religion